Addison is a village in Lenawee County of the U.S. state of Michigan.  The population was 573 at the 2020 census. The village is located on the boundary between Rollin Township on the south and Woodstock Township on the north.

Geography

History 

In 1834, when John Talbot settled along a winding creek in the infancy of southeast Michigan's history, the area was a vast forest, dotted with clear blue lakes and occupied by the Potawatomi. With the raising of a simple grist mill along Bean Creek around December 1835, Addison's history was started, operating under the settlement name “Manetue.”

Having failed to secure a spot along the river that provided enough water power to run his mill, Talbot dismantled the settlement and moved to the present location of Addison, and by the fall of 1836, milling operations restarted. The town was renamed “Peru” by 1838, and over the next generation would be given several other monikers before the final name of Addison was entered onto plat maps in 1851. Addison J. Comstock, a banker from Adrian, Michigan, purchased a sizable plat of the pioneer town and changed the identity to reflect this acquisition. The village itself was incorporated as such in 1893.

The village grew sufficiently to attract the railroad in 1883, an event which contributed to a sudden expansion of the local economy. Businesses came to Addison in great numbers including a three-story hotel, designed to cater to the visiting tourist. The Addison Courier newspaper started its 76-year run in 1884, and the economic upturn brought on by the railroad continued well after the line ceased to operate through Addison.

One of Addison's last landmarks, the old grist mill built in 1848, was removed in 1980. Despite the economic downturn of the village in the last half of the 20th century, a large 3-day sesquicentennial celebration was held in 1984. Additionally, a 175th Anniversary celebration spanning only one day was held in the village on August 8, 2009.
In the later 2010s, the medical cannabis industry identified Addison as a community open to economic expansion with provisioning and grow centers. As of 2022, Addison has two open facilities and two additional operations under construction.

Two history books have been written on the village in recent years, "The History of Addison, Michigan" in 1996 and "Memories of Addison" in 2013, both by village historian Dan Cherry. Among the early village historians were A.J. Kempton, Richard DeGreene, J. DeWitt McLouth and Alice Slocum.

Addison got its own radio station in August 2014 with the sign-on of WQAR-LP "Q95 the Panther" at 95.7 FM. The station is owned by Addison Community Schools and programmed by students with classic rock music.

Addison Community Schools is a K-12 central campus with 729 students. The current superintendent, set to retire June 30, 2022, is Steve Guerra. The incoming superintendent is Daniel Patterson. The school mascot is a black panther.

Demographics

2010 census
As of the census of 2010, there were 605 people, 245 households, and 156 families residing in the village. The racial makeup of the village was 97.0% White, 0.5% African American, 0.3% from other races, and 2.1% from two or more races. Hispanic or Latino of any race were 1.0% of the population.

There were 245 households, of which 35.9% had children under the age of 18 living with them, 42.0% were married couples living together, 16.3% had a female householder with no husband present, 5.3% had a male householder with no wife present, and 36.3% were non-families. 28.2% of all households were made up of individuals, and 11.8% had someone living alone who was 65 years of age or older. The average household size was 2.47 and the average family size was 3.06.

The median age in the village was 35.1 years. 26.8% of residents were under the age of 18; 10% were between the ages of 18 and 24; 26.3% were from 25 to 44; 26.1% were from 45 to 64; and 10.7% were 65 years of age or older. The gender makeup of the village was 46.8% male and 53.2% female.

2000 census
As of the census of 2000, there were 627 people, 247 households, and 164 families residing in the village. The racial makeup of the village was 98.41% White, 0.16% Native American, 0.96% Asian, 0.16% from other races, and 0.32% from two or more races. Hispanic or Latino of any race were 2.07% of the population.

There were 247 households, out of which 35.2% had children under the age of 18 living with them, 50.2% were married couples living together, 13.8% had a female householder with no husband present, and 33.2% were non-families. 29.6% of all households were made up of individuals, and 10.5% had someone living alone who was 65 years of age or older. The average household size was 2.54 and the average family size was 3.17.

In the village, the population was spread out, with 31.1% under the age of 18, 9.7% from 18 to 24, 28.2% from 25 to 44, 19.6% from 45 to 64, and 11.3% who were 65 years of age or older. The median age was 35 years. For every 100 females, there were 94.7 males. For every 100 females age 18 and over, there were 87.8 males.

The median income for a household in the village was $35,781, and the median income for a family was $45,313. Males had a median income of $31,875 versus $23,000 for females. The per capita income for the village was $15,883. About 6.0% of families and 8.1% of the population were below the poverty line, including 7.2% of those under age 18 and 7.8% of those age 65 or over.

Transportation
 intersects Main Street.

Notable people
Maxine Kline, professional baseball player of 1940s, was raised in Addison.
Joseph H. Steere, Chief Justice of the Michigan Supreme Court, was born in Addison.
Nick Smith, retired politician, born in Addison and 1953 Addison High School graduate. Served politically at the local, state and National level.
John Randolph Bray, early animator, lived in Addison as a child. His father was a traveling minister who served the Methodist-Episcopal Church in Addison for a time.

References

External links
Addison Community Schools web site

Villages in Lenawee County, Michigan
Villages in Michigan
Populated places established in 1834
1834 establishments in Michigan Territory